Kotei is a surname. Notable people with the surname include:

Amon Kotei (1915–2011), Ghanaian artist and surveyor
David Kotei (born 1950), Ghanaian boxer
James Kotei (born 1993), Ghanaian footballer
J. E. A. Kotei, military pilot and diplomat
Robert Kotei (1935–1979), Ghanaian soldier, athlete, and politician